The Missouri Department of Agriculture (MDA) is an agency of the government of Missouri that reports to the Governor of Missouri. MDA is responsible for serving, promoting, and protecting the agricultural producers, processors, and consumers of Missouri's food, fuel, and fiber products.

MDA is under the direction and supervision of the Director of Agriculture. The current director is Chris Chinn, who was appointed by the governor and confirmed by the Missouri Senate on January 29, 2017.

Organization

Director of Agriculture
Deputy Director
Office of the Director
Ag Business Development Division
Animal Health Division
Grain Inspection and Warehousing Division
Plant Industries Division
Weights, Measures and Consumers Protection

See also
United States Department of Agriculture

References

External links
Missouri Department of Agriculture official website
Publications by or about Missouri Department of Agriculture at Internet Archive.

Agriculture, Department of
State departments of agriculture of the United States